In physics, the principle of covariance emphasizes the formulation of physical laws using only those physical quantities the measurements of which the observers in different frames of reference could unambiguously correlate.

Mathematically, the physical quantities must transform covariantly, that is, under a certain representation of the group of coordinate transformations between admissible frames of reference of the physical theory. This group is referred to as the covariance group.

The principle of covariance does not require invariance of the physical laws under the group of admissible transformations although in most cases the equations are actually invariant. However, in the theory of weak interactions, the equations are not invariant under reflections (but are, of course, still covariant).

Covariance in Newtonian mechanics 
In Newtonian mechanics the admissible frames of reference are inertial frames with relative velocities much smaller than the speed of light. Time is then absolute and the transformations between admissible frames of references are Galilean transformations which (together with rotations, translations, and reflections) form the Galilean group. The covariant physical quantities are Euclidean scalars, vectors, and tensors. An example of a covariant equation is Newton's second law,

where the covariant quantities are the mass  of a moving body (scalar), the velocity  of the body (vector), the force  acting on the body, and the invariant time .

Covariance in special relativity 
In special relativity the admissible frames of reference are all inertial frames. The transformations between frames are the Lorentz transformations which (together with the rotations, translations, and reflections) form the Poincaré group. The covariant quantities are four-scalars, four-vectors etc., of the Minkowski space (and also more complicated objects like bispinors and others). An example of a covariant equation is the Lorentz force equation of motion of a charged particle in an electromagnetic field (a generalization of Newton's second law)

Covariance in general relativity 
In general relativity, the admissible frames of reference are all reference frames. The transformations between frames are all arbitrary (invertible and differentiable) coordinate transformations. The covariant quantities are scalar fields, vector fields, tensor fields etc., defined on spacetime considered as a manifold. Main example of covariant equation is the Einstein field equations.

See also 
 Principle of relativity
 Lorentz covariance
 General covariance

References 

Theory of relativity